The Buckthorn aphid or Buckthorn-potato aphid (Aphis nasturtii) is an aphid in the superfamily Aphidoidea in the order Hemiptera. It is a true bug and sucks sap from plants. It is a cosmopolitan species.

Economic importance
It is known to be a major insect pest on sunflower plants, lettuce, potato, beets, and buckthorn. The aphid is also act as a vector to 15 plant viruses.

References 

 Aphis nasturtii Kaltenbach, 1843, Itis.gov

nasturtii
Agricultural pest insects
Cosmopolitan arthropods